L50 may refer to :
 N50, L50, and related statistics, used in genome assembly
 HMS Rochester (L50), Royal Navy ship
 Daihatsu New Line#First generation (L50), |Daihatsu compact truck model
 British L-class submarine#Group 3 (L50-class), British submarine class
 Suzuki Carry#Fifth generation (L50/60), Suzuki van
 Landing Craft L-50, Swedish Navy landing craft
 Honduran lempira, Honduran banknote
 Suzuki FB series engine#L50, Suzuki FB series engine model
 HMAS Tobruk (L 50), Royal Australian Navy ship
 Kavango – Southwest Bantu languages, Bantu language
 List of Toyota transmissions, Toyota transmission